Søren Østberg (born 21 February 1962) is a Danish butterfly swimmer. He competed in two events at the 1984 Summer Olympics.

References

External links
 

1962 births
Living people
Danish male butterfly swimmers
Olympic swimmers of Denmark
Swimmers at the 1984 Summer Olympics
Swimmers from Copenhagen